R